Brazil competed at the 2022 World Games held in Birmingham, United States from 7 to 17 July 2022. Athletes representing Brazil won two gold medals, one silver medal and five bronze medals. The country finished in 28th place in the medal table.

Medalists

Invitational sports

Competitors
The following is the list of number of competitors in the Games.

Aerobic gymnastics

Brazil won one gold medal in aerobic gymnastics.

Artistic roller skating

Brazil competed in artistic roller skating.

Beach handball

Brazil won one bronze medal in beach handball.

Cue sports

Brazil competed in cue sports.

Dancesport

Brazil competed in dancesport (breaking).

Fistball

Brazil won the bronze medal in both the men's and women's fistball tournaments.

Flag football

Brazil competed in flag football.

Karate

Brazil won two medals in karate.

Men

Women

Kickboxing

Brazil competed in kickboxing.

Orienteering

Brazil competed in orienteering.

Powerlifting

Brazil competed in powerlifting.

Rhythmic gymnastics

Brazil competed in rhythmic gymnastics.

Squash

Brazil competed in squash.

Sumo

Brazil won one bronze medal in sumo.

Track speed skating

One competitor was scheduled to represent Brazil in track speed skating.

Water skiing

Brazil competed in water skiing.

Wushu

Brazil won one bronze medal in wushu.

References

Nations at the 2022 World Games
2022
World Games